{{DISPLAYTITLE:C15H24O}}
The molecular formula C15H24O may refer to:

 Butylated hydroxytoluene, a food additive
 Khusimol
 Nonylphenol
 1-Nonyl-4-phenol
 α-Santalol
 β-Santalol
 Spathulenol

Molecular formulas